D.O.D. is the sixth studio album by American hip hop group Do Or Die. It was released on February 1, 2005 via The Legion Records. Recording sessions took place at Pressure Point Studios, The Chocolate Factory, Chicago Recording Company and United Technique Recording in Chicago, at the Record Plant and Ocean Way Recording in Los Angeles, at The Legendary Traxster, Inc., and at The Sound Villa. Production was handled by The Legendary Traxster, Kanye West, DJ Quik, No I.D., N.O. Joe, R. Kelly, Scott Storch, Toxic, Vudu and Wax Master Maurice, with Rudolph J. Acosta serving as executive producer. It features guest appearances from Kanye West, Johnny P, Bounty Killer, DJ Quik, Grind, Malik Yusef, Remy Ma, Ric Jilla, R. Kelly, Sasha, Shawnna, Syleena Johnson, the Legendary Traxster and Twista.

The album peaked at No. 40 on the Billboard 200 and No. 14 on the Top R&B/Hip-Hop Albums chart. "U Already Know", used in NBA Live 2005, "Chain of Command" used in Madden NFL 06, and "Getcha Weight Up" used in NBA Live 06.

Track listing

Sample credits
Tracks 6 and 20 contain samples from "You're My Latest, My Greatest Inspiration" written by Leon Huff and Kenneth Gamble as performed by Teddy Pendergrass
Track 10 contains samples from "Go On Without You!" written by Larry Troutman and Roger Troutman as performed by Shirley Murdock
Track 12 contains samples from "The Closer I Get to You" written by James Mtume and Reggie Lucas as performed by Donny Hathaway
Track 13 contains samples from "Can't We Fall In Love" written by Peter Ivers and John Lewis Parker as performed by Phyllis Hyman

Personnel

Darnell "Belo Zero" Smith – vocals
Dennis "AK47" Round – vocals
Anthony "N.A.R.D." Round – vocals
Reminisce "Remy Ma" Mackie – vocals (track 5)
Kanye West – vocals & producer (tracks: 6, 10, 20)
Robert Kelly – vocals & producer (track 8)
Rodney "Bounty Killer" Price – vocals (track 9)
Karen "Sasha" Chin – vocals (track 9)
Syleena Johnson – vocals (track 11)
Carl "Twista"  Mitchell – vocals (track 11)
Ric Jilla – vocals (track 13)
John "Johnny P" Pigram – vocals (tracks: 13, 19)
Malik Yusef El Shabazz Jones – vocals (track 14)
Grind – vocals (track 15)
Samuel "The Legendary Traxster" Lindley – vocals (track 17), producer (tracks: 1, 3, 14-17), engineering
Paris Cole – backing vocals (track 17)
David "DJ Quik" Blake – vocals & producer (track 19)
Rashawnna "Shawnna" Guy – vocals (track 20)
Singer's Singer's Ltd. – backing vocals (tracks: 6, 10, 20)
Trevor "Kay-Tone" Caston – keyboards (tracks: 1, 15, 16)
Neil Artwick – keyboards (track 14)
Richie Davis – guitar (tracks: 14, 17)
Anthony Glenn Brown – bass (track 17)
Devonta – keyboards (track 19)
Erick Todd Coomes – bass (track 19)
Keenan "Keynote" Holloway – instruments (tracks: 6, 10, 20)
Joseph "N.O. Joe" Johnson – producer (track 2)
Scott Storch – producer (track 5)
Matthew "DJ Vudu" McAllister – producer (track 8)
Frederick "Toxic" Taylor – producer (track 11)
Maurice "Waxmaster" Minor – producer (track 12)
Ernest "No I.D."  Wilson – producer (track 13)
Dan Burns – engineering
Eric Schlotzer – engineering
Jeff Lane – engineering
Jun Ishizeki – engineering
Larry Sternum – engineering
Wayne Allison – engineering
Eddy Schreyer – mastering
Rudolph J. Acosta – executive producer, A&R
Benjamin Niles – design
Vincent Soyez – photography

Charts

References

External links

2005 albums
Do or Die (group) albums
Albums produced by DJ Quik
Albums produced by No I.D.
Albums produced by N.O. Joe
Albums produced by R. Kelly
Albums produced by Kanye West
Albums produced by Scott Storch
Albums produced by The Legendary Traxster
Albums recorded at Record Plant (Los Angeles)